The 2014–15 Bangladeshi cricket season featured tours of the country by Zimbabwe and Pakistan. Rangpur Division won the National Cricket League (NCL) championship title for the first time.

Honours
 National Cricket League – Rangpur Division
 Bangladesh Premier League – not contested
 Most runs – Liton Das (Rangpur) 1,232 @ 77.00
 Most wickets – Abdur Razzak (Khulna) 59 @ 25.81

International cricket

Zimbabwe toured Bangladesh from 26 October to 1 December 2014, playing three Test matches and five One Day International matches. Bangladesh won the Test series 3–0 and the ODI series 5–0.

Pakistan toured from 15 April to 10 May 2015, playing one Twenty20 International (T20I), three One Day Internationals (ODIs) and two Test matches. Pakistan won the Test series 1–0 after the first Test was a drawn game, but Bangladesh won the ODI series 3–0, Bangladesh first ever series win against Pakistan, and also won the sole Twenty20 International played.

See also
 History of cricket in Bangladesh

Notes

Further reading
 Wisden Cricketers' Almanack 2015

External links
 CricInfo re Bangladesh
 CricketArchive re tournaments in Bangladesh in 2014–15

2014 in Bangladeshi cricket
2015 in Bangladeshi cricket
Bangladeshi cricket seasons from 2000–01
Domestic cricket competitions in 2014–15